Mohammad Mehdi Behkish (born 1944) is an Iranian Economist and retired Associate professor at the Allameh Tabatabaei University of Tehran. He served as president of the Iran-Italy Chamber of Commerce for more than 21 years (1992-2013), and is currently president of the Presidency Council.

He has also been the executive director (Secretary General) of the Iranian National Committee of ICC (International Chamber of Commerce) in Iran since 1985.

Early life and education
Prof. Behkish was born in Mashhad, Iran, where he attended high school.

He earned his B.A. in Economics in Tehran University (1967), his M.A. in Economics in University of Western Ontario in Canada (1971), and his Ph.D. in Econometrics & Economic Development in Indiana University in Bloomington, Indiana, United States (1977).

Upon returning to Iran in 1978, he joined Abureyhan University, which was later integrated with various other universities and institutions to establish Alameh Tabatabaei University after the Islamic Revolution.

Career
Dr. Behkish's career was formed in an environment in which his business experiences complemented his academic work in the university. He began his various positions in different Chamber in Iran with a consultative position, before being raised sharply to higher positions such as Secretary General of Iran Chamber of Commerce, Vice Chairman & S.G. of ICC in Iran, and President of Iran-Italy Chamber (for which he received Knight of the Order of the Star of Italian Solidarity (cavaliere) from the President of State of Italy in 2009).

Dr. Behkish is among a few economists whose advice is well considered in both the Private Sector and Public Sector.

He strongly believes in market economy, and has pushed strongly for joining Iran to WTO before it became almost impossible.

He has tried continuously to push the government to liberalize the economy, using his seat in the University or his official positions in chambers.

Due to Dr. Behkish's work with the ICC (International Chamber of Commerce) for more than 25 years, he is well aware of the benefits of globalization, and hence, in addition to writing his books on such related subjects, he has also kept a window open in the country to connect interested businessman to international business communities.

Publications

Books
Dr. Behkish has published four books, with the latest being "Iranian Economy in the Context of Globalization"  in Persian, which used IMD ( International Institute for Management Development ) as a model for measuring competitiveness of an economy.

His other books are primarily applications of economic liberalization, conducted with the cooperation of two other colleagues from his work with the Ministry of Mines & Metals.

Articles
Dr. Behkish is also a columnist in a variety of economic newspapers & magazines. His list of published contains more than 250 articles & 150 interviews.

His recent articles include:
"China Trade War & ُSacrificing Iran", ECOIran, 3 August 2019
"We Are Trapped, Because of Lack of Strategic Approach to Economic Relations", Tejarat-e-Farda Weekly, 6 July 2019
Where we are Going to...? (Is Iran Caught Between USA & China Conflict", 22 June 2019 
"Two Proposals for Taking Advantage of Great Social Capital", Donya-e-eqtesad Newspaper, 18 June 2013
"Impact of Economic Crisis on the Process of Globalization", Mehrnameh Monthly Magazine, March 2013
"Paradox of Iran’s Economy", Iran International, March 2013
"Iran Development, History & Private Sector", Interview with Dr. Behkish, Development & Industry Monthly Magazine, January 2013
"US-China Rivalry in Asia & Iran’s Position", Iran International, December 2012
"Liberalization in the Context of Development Islamism in Turkey and Iran", Interview with Dr. Behkish, Mehrnameh Monthly Magazine, 20 August 2012
"Sustainable Economy Unity", Iran International, July 2012
"Reasons of Unemployment among Educated People", Etemad Newspaper, 22 July 2012
"Control of Corruption & Mafia in Georgia", Donya-e-eqtesad Newspaper, 12 June 2012
"Ambiguous Point in Removing Subsidies", Donya-e-eqtesad Newspaper, 13 May 2012
"The Model for Determining Exchange Rate", Donya-e-eqtesad Newspaper, 15 February 2012
"Proposed Package to Increase Production and Jobs", Donya-e-eqtesad Newspaper, 7 August 2011
"Warning on Effects of Price Correction of Energy Carriers", Donya-e-eqtesad Newspaper, 10 March 2010
"World Private Sector & Protectionism in Crisis", Rastak, 24 November 2009
"Iran, Financial Crisis & New Conditions", Rastak /Roozonline, 14 December 2008
"Relationship between Democracy, Policy & Economy", Etemad Newspaper, 8 June 2008
"Petrodollars Weakens Democracy", Hamshahri Newspaper, 27 May 2008
"Paradox of "Freedom in Choosing" from Thought to Action", Donya-e-eqtesad Newspaper, 6, February 2008
"Our Comparative Advantage is Trade", Interview with Dr. Behkish, Monthly Attachment of Donya-e-eqtesad Newspaper, 2, September 2007
"India’s Experience on Requirements for Communication with International Community", Donya-e-eqtesad Newspaper, 22 May 2006
"A Model for Planned Allocation & Financial Resources Control Using Fuzzy Logic (A Case Study on Kish Free Zone Org.)", Program & Budget Magazine, Nov./Dec. 2003
"Partnership Demanded Not Capital", Iran International 4, March 1999
"New Prospects of Iran-Italy Economic Relations", the seminar of Iran-Day in Italy, Rome, 28 February 1997
"Trade Opportunities in Iran and Ways to Further Expansion of Trade with the Netherlands," the seminar in Rotterdam, Chamber of Commerce, 11 December 1996
"Britain & Iran in a Changing World", Anglo-Iranian Roundtable, University of Oxford, Windsor, 10–12 March 1992
"Prospects of Iran-Italy Economic Relations", the seminar organized by Italian Institute for Asia, Rome, 1992

References

External links
Iran-Italy Chamber of Commerce
ICC- International Chamber of Commerce
Iranian National Committee of ICC (ICCIran)
Founders of Irano British Chamber of Commerce, Industries & Mines
International Institute for Caspian Studies
List of Dr. Behkish’s Articles in magazines
Iranian e-Commerce Scientific Association
Dr. Behkish’s PhD Thesis:“Economics of investing in human capital: the case of Iran”
Oral History: Interview with Dr. Behkish
Articles web page of ICCIran (Persian)

1944 births
Living people
20th-century Iranian economists
University of Tehran alumni
University of Western Ontario alumni
Indiana University Bloomington alumni
21st-century Iranian economists